Bian Zhilin (1910–2000) was a 20th-century Chinese poet, translator and literature researcher.

Bian was born in Haimen, Jiangsu on December 8, 1910, and liked to read classical and modern Chinese poems when he was very young. In 1929, he entered the English department of Beijing University to study. During this time he was greatly influenced by the English romantic poems and French symbolic poems, and began to write poems by himself. The poetry anthology The Han Garden Collection co-written by Bian, Li Guangtian and He Qifang, was published in 1936.

Bian's poems were related to the Crescent School which advocated modern metrical poetry, but his style was closer to the Chinese symbolists. He once coedited the magazine New Poems with the representative figure of Chinese symbolist poetry Dai Wangshu. Bian's poems of this time represented his dissatisfaction and thinking of the social reality as a young intellectual, showed his quick perception, and sometimes hard to understand. He sought for strangeness of words, tidiness of syllables, and many of his poems were full of a melancholy mood.

During the Second Sino-Japanese War, he taught at Sichuan University and National Southwestern Associated University. From 1938 to 1939 he took a visit to Yan'an and Taihangshan, and once taught at the institute of Lu Xun's art and literature. Bian compiled his A Selection of 10 Years' Poetry (1930–1939) in 1941, and it was published in the next year. In 1946, he went to the Nankai University to teach.

In 1949, Bian became a professor of the foreign language department of Beijing University. From 1964, he served as a researcher of the Institute of Foreign Literature of the Chinese Academy of Social Sciences.

Further reading
 Chinese Writers on Writing featuring Bian Zhilin. Ed. Arthur Sze. (Trinity University Press, 2010).
Lloyd Haft, Pien Chih-lin: A Study in Modern Chinese Poetry. Dordrecht: Foris 1983, republished Berlin: De Gruyter 2011.

References

External links
 Bian Zhilin Encyclopædia Britannica

2000 deaths
1910 births
Republic of China poets
People's Republic of China poets
Translators to Chinese
Writers from Nantong
Educators from Nantong
20th-century Chinese translators
20th-century Chinese poets
National University of Peking alumni
Academic staff of Peking University
Academic staff of Nankai University
People from Haimen
Poets from Jiangsu
Academic staff of the National Southwestern Associated University